Kirov is a village in the Samukh Rayon of Azerbaijan.

References
 

Populated places in Samukh District